McClures may refer to:
McClure's Magazine, a popular United States illustrated monthly magazine at the turn of the 20th century
McClure Naismith, a Scottish commercial law firm